Marcus Scribner (born January 7, 2000) is an American actor. He is best known for starring as Andre "Junior" Johnson Jr. in all eight seasons of the ABC sitcom Black-ish, before starring as Junior in its spin-off Grown-ish from the fifth season onward (also serving as the series' narrator, after guest starring in the second to fourth seasons and Mixed-ish), as well as voicing the character Bow in the Netflix animated series She-Ra and the Princesses of Power.

Early life and education 
Scribner was born and raised in Los Angeles. His name is derived from Roman and Greek mythology, like those of his father Troy and sister Athena. Scribner also has a dog named Zeus whom he adopted as a puppy to commemorate his first professional acting job. Similar to his character on Black-ish, his father is Black while his mother is biracial (African American and white). His father's family is from Los Angeles while his maternal grandmother is from England. He began studying acting at age seven. At the time he was very shy and didn't have any hobbies. In addition to sports, Scribner took an acting class and immediately fell in love with it. From that point, Scribner took acting classes on the weekends. Scribner later admitted that at the time, he was afraid of getting injured. Despite that, he enjoys sports such as basketball and lacrosse and also loves video games.  When he was in kindergarten, Scribner hit his head on concrete while playing basketball and had to get five staples. Scribner started playing the clarinet in fifth grade. Though Scribner started at public high school in 2014, by early 2015, he was enrolled in home school to accommodate his work schedule.

Career 
When he was 10 years old, Scribner booked his first guest-star role on the ABC crime dramedy Castle. Scribner would go on to appear in an episodes of Fox's New Girl, TBS' Wedding Band and Nickelodeon's Wendell & Vinnie. At the age of 14, Scribner booked his first major role when he was cast in the role Andre Johnson Jr. in the ABC sitcom Black-ish opposite Anthony Anderson, Tracee Ellis Ross, Laurence Fishburne and Jenifer Lewis. Scribner actually beat out Anderson's own son Nathan for the role. In an interview with Teen Vogue, the actor explained that he heavily identified with the show. Scribner was 13 when he first auditioned for the series and 14 years old when the pilot was filmed. Scribner received an NAACP Image Award nomination for Outstanding Supporting Actor in a Comedy for his portrayal of Junior in the first season. In 2015, Scribner voiced Buck in Pixar's animated film The Good Dinosaur. In 2016, Scribner began voicing the recurring role of Smudge as a guest star on the Netflix animated series Home: Adventures with Tip & Oh. Later that summer Scribner started production on the Independent comedy Alexander IRL opposite Nathan Kress. With the launch of the Freeform spin-off Grown-ish, Scribner takes on a more prominent role during the fourth season of Black-ish. In 2018, it was announced that Scribner would star in thriller "Confessional."

Scribner voiced Bow in the animated Netflix series, She-Ra and the Princesses of Power. As his name suggests, Bow is a skilled archer. Bow is also the best friend of Glimmer and She-Ra.

In March 2022, it was announced that Scribner would be continuing as Andre Johnson Jr. by shifting over to Grown-ish for its fifth season, following the end of Black-ishs eight season run, replacing Yara Shahidi as the lead character and narrator of the series.

Filmography

Film

Television

Awards and nominations

References

External links 
 

2000 births
21st-century American male actors
Male actors from Los Angeles
American male child actors
American people of English descent
African-American male actors
American male film actors
American male television actors
American male voice actors
Living people
21st-century African-American people
20th-century African-American people